Haft Tepe (also Haft Tape) is an archaeological site situated in the Khuzestan Province in south-western Iran. At this site the possible remains of the Elamite city of Kabnak were discovered in 1908, and excavations are still carried out.

History 
The city of Kabnak is mentioned as an important political centre during the reign of the Elamite king Tepti-Ahar, the last king of the Kidinuid dynasty ruling in the 15th century BC. He may also have been buried in the city. After his death the centre of power returned to the old capital Susa, although there is no clear evidence that Kabnak ever held real power at all. Due to the turmoil of this era it is possible the construction of Kabnak was necessary after Tepti-Ahar lost control over Susa, however this theory has not been completely confirmed by solid proof. Some centuries later another city was built at the nearby site of Choqa Zanbil.

Excavations at Haft Tepe revealed a large temple founded by Tepti-Ahar where the god Kirwashir was worshiped. Beneath the temple lay a subterranean funerary complex intended for the king and his family. Skeletal remains were found in the tomb, though it is not certain they belong to royalty. 

Another large structure found at the site was perhaps the foundations of a ziggurat, along with courtyards and suites of rooms. The temple complex was decorated with bronze plates and wall paintings. Administrative texts belonging to the reigns of Tepti-Ahar and Inshushinak-zunkir-nappipir were also found at the site. Recently some clay statuettes of fertility goddesses have been unearthed at the site.

Archaeology 
The site is around 1.5 km by 800 meters made up of 14 mounds with the highest being 17 meters high.

Haft Tepe was first surveyed by the French archaeologist Jacques de Morgan in 1908. The site was excavated in the period from 1965 to 1979 by a team from the University of Tehran, led by the Iranian archaeologist Ezzat Negahban. A legal document was found sealed with a cylinder seal, unusual at that time:

Since 2003 excavations have been carried out by a team of German-Iranian archaeologists, including the University of Mainz, University of Kiel and the Iranian Cultural Heritage Organization, headed by Behzad Mofidi in ten seasons through 2013.

In the 2006 season a number of cuneiform administrative tablets were recovered and have now been published. They are primarily inventories.

See also 
 Cities of the ancient Near East

Notes

References 
 Izzat Allāh Nigāhbān, Excavations at Haft Tepe, Iran, University of Pennsylvania Museum of Archaeology, 1991, 
 Beckman, G.1991A stray tablet from Haft Tépé. IrAnt 26: 81–83
 Glassner, J. J.1991Les textes de Haft Tépé, la Susiane et l’Élam au II millénaire. Pp. 109–126 in Mesopotamie et Elam,ed. L. De Meyer & H. Gasche. Mesopotamian History and Environment, Occasional Publications I. Genth: University of  Genth
 P. Herrero, Tablettes administratives de Haft Tépé, Cahiers de la Délégation archéologique francaise en Iran, vol. 6, pp. 93–116, 1976
 P. Herrero and J. J Glassner, Haft-Tépé: Choix de textes I, Iranica Antiqua, vol. 25, pp. 1–45, 1990
 P. Herrero and J. J Glassner, Haft-Tépé: Choix de textes II, Iranica Antiqua, vol. 26, pp. 39–80, 1991
 P. Herrero and J. J Glassner, Haft-Tépé: Choix de textes III, Iranica Antiqua, vol. 28, pp. 97–135, 1993
 P. Herrero and J. J Glassner, Haft-Tépé: Choix de textes IV, Iranica Antiqua, vol. 31, pp. 51–82, 1996
 E. Reiner, Inscription from a Royal Elamite Tomb, Archiv für Orientforschung, vol. 24, pp. 87–102, 1973

External links 
 Livius.org: Photos of Haft Tepe
 Inscriptions Found in Haft Tepe Ready to be Decoded - 2006
 Iranian, German archaeologists return to Haft-Tappeh - 2008
 Archaeological Research at Haft Tappeh - University of Mainz

Archaeological sites in Iran
Elam
Former populated places in Iran
History of Khuzestan Province
Buildings and structures in Khuzestan Province